Big Falls is a city in Koochiching County, Minnesota, United States. The population was 175 at the 2020 census.

U.S. Highway 71 and Minnesota State Highway 6 are two of the main routes in Big Falls.

History
A post office called Big Falls has been in operation since 1906. The city was named for a nearby waterfall on the Big Fork River.

Geography

Climate

Demographics

2010 census
As of the census of 2010, there were 236 people, 130 households, and 63 families living in the city. The racial makeup of the city was 97.0% White, 1.7% Native American, and 1.3% from two or more races. Hispanic or Latino of any race were 1.7% of the population.

There were 130 households, of which 13.8% had children under the age of 18 living with them, 42.3% were married couples living together, 3.8% had a female householder with no husband present, 2.3% had a male householder with no wife present, and 51.5% were non-families. 42.3% of all households were made up of individuals, and 16.1% had someone living alone who was 65 years of age or older. The average household size was 1.82 and the average family size was 2.43.

The median age in the city was 53.8 years. 11.4% of residents were under the age of 18; 2.7% were between the ages of 18 and 24; 18.2% were from 25 to 44; 44% were from 45 to 64; and 23.7% were 65 years of age or older. The gender makeup of the city was 53.0% male and 47.0% female.

2000 census
As of the census of 2000, there were 264 people, 134 households, and 73 families living in the city. The racial makeup of the city was 98.11% White, 0.38% Native American, 0.38% Asian, and 1.14% from two or more races.

There were 134 households, out of which 21.6% had children under the age of 18 living with them, 42.5% were married couples living together, 8.2% had a female householder with no husband present, and 44.8% were non-families. 41.8% of all households were made up of individuals, and 17.9% had someone living alone who was 65 years of age or older.  The average household size was 1.97 and the average family size was 2.61.

In the city, the population was spread out, with 19.7% under the age of 18, 3.8% from 18 to 24, 24.6% from 25 to 44, 30.3% from 45 to 64, and 21.6% who were 65 years of age or older.  The median age was 46 years. For every 100 females, there were 109.5 males.  For every 100 females age 18 and over, there were 107.8 males.

The median income for a household in the city was $26,458, and the median income for a family was $28,125. Males had a median income of $24,375 versus $17,083 for females. The per capita income for the city was $14,528.  About 12.0% of families and 14.7% of the population were below the poverty line, including 20.0% of those under the age of eighteen and 7.3% of those 65 or over.

Media

Television

References

External links
 City of Big Falls – Official Website

Cities in Minnesota
Cities in Koochiching County, Minnesota